Robert A. Kyle is a Professor of Medicine, Laboratory Medicine and Pathology at the Mayo Clinic. He specializes in the care of patients with plasma cell dyscrasias. Throughout his career Kyle has published more than 1,850 scientific papers and abstracts on myeloma and other plasma cell disorders... Some of Dr. Kyle's most notable scientific contributions include naming the disorder known as Monoclonal gammopathy of undetermined significance (MGUS) as well as establishing the epidemiology and long-term prognosis of MGUS.

Education 
1961 Hematology Research Fellowship - National Cancer Institute
1958 MS - University of Minnesota
1955 Internal Medicine Residency - Mayo Clinic
1953 Internship - Northwestern University Feinberg School of Medicine
1952 MD - Northwestern University Feinberg School of Medicine
1948 BS - University of North Dakota
1946 AA - Dakota College at Bottineau

Personal life

Early life
Kyle grew up on a rural farm in North Dakota during the 1930's and 1940's. During this time he attended a one room school house from which he graduated in 1944 at the age of 16. Shortly after graduating from high school he was almost drafted to serve in World War II, but shortly after he reported to Fort Snelling the U.S. made an official decision to no longer draft adolescents under the age of 18. Because of this, Robert was then able to return to the North Dakota school of Forestry and complete his AA degree

Philately 
Kyle first became interested in stamp collecting (Philately) as a young boy, but it was not until he suffered a dislocated lumbar disc in 1965 that he found time to increase his stamp collecting activity. In the process of pursuing this interest he has received a number of awards including the John Brain Medal, the Myrtle Watt Award, and the award of Distinguished Topical Philatelist.

Notable awards

2009 - Lifetime Achievement Distinguished Lecturer - Mayo Clinic Alix School of Medicine
2008 - Wallace Coulter Lifetime Achievement Award - American Society of Hematology
2008 - Austin Weisberger Lectureship - Case Western Reserve University
2007 - David Karnofsky Award and Lecture - American Society of Clinical Oncology
2006 - Joseph Michaeli Award for Contributions to Myeloma - Weill Cornell Medicine
2005 - Celgene Career Achievement Award in Clinical Hematology - Celgene
2005 - Mayo Distinguished Alumni Award - Mayo Clinic Alix School of Medicine
2004 - Lifetime Achievement Award in Waldenstrom's Macroglobulinemia - International Waldenstrom's Macroglobulinemia Foundation
2003 - Honorary Doctorate - University of North Dakota
2003 - Lifetime Achievement Award - International Myeloma Foundation
2003 - E. Stephen Kurtides Lectureship - Northwestern University Feinberg School of Medicine
2003 - Honorary Member - Royal College of Pathologists
2001 - Award for Waldenstrom's Macroglobulinemia (1st Recipient) - Research Fund for Waldenstrom's Macroglobulinemia
2001 - Socius Honores Causa - Hungarian Section on Amyloidosis
2000 - Award for Excellence for Clinical Investigation - Mayo Clinic
2000 - Honorary Doctorate Degree in Medicine - Polacki Dzjaržauny Universitet
1999 - Karis Award - Mayo Clinic
1998 - Sioux Award - University of North Dakota
1996 - Mayo Distinguished Clinician Award - Mayo Foundation
1995 - Henry S. Plummer Distinguished Internist Award - Mayo Clinic
1991 - Waldenstrom Award for Myeloma Research - International Workshop for Myeloma
1987 - Golden Service Award - North Dakota State University
1981 - William H. Donner Professor of Medicine and Laboratory Medicine - Mayo Clinic College of Medicine and Science
1978 - Profesor Pro Tempore - Walter Reed National Military Medical Center

References

Year of birth missing (living people)
Living people